= Matakil Falls =

Matikil Falls is a waterfall on the Koumbala River in the Central African Republic.

It is situated 15 kilometers north-west of Koumbala Camp (8°34'N, 21°10'E) where the river drops over a large east–west fault, forming a 70-80 meter waterfall over a north-facing precipitous cliff. A lush gallery forest with tall trees of Ficus and other genera is adjacent to the falls.
